The Coffeeville School District is a public school district based in Coffeeville, Mississippi (USA).

In addition to Coffeeville, the district also serves the towns of Oakland and Tillatoba as well as most of rural Yalobusha County.

Schools
Coffeeville High School
Coffeeville Elementary School

Demographics

2006-07 school year

There were a total of 640 students enrolled in the Coffeeville School District during the 2006–2007 school year. The gender makeup of the district was 50% female and 50% male. The racial makeup of the district was 83.59% African American and 16.41% White. 84.1% of the district's students were eligible to receive free lunch.

Previous school years

Accountability statistics

See also
List of school districts in Mississippi

References

External links
 

Education in Yalobusha County, Mississippi
School districts in Mississippi